Kakarlapalli/Kakarlapally is a village in Khammam district, Andhra Pradesh, India. The name has been derived from the great ancestor kingdom of Telangana region called "Kakatiya".

Demographics
The village population is about 8000.

References

Villages in Khammam district